Pizza Studio is a Los Angeles-based pizza franchise founded in 2013 by entrepreneur and former venture capitalist, Samit Varma.  The fast-casual concept allows diners to create their own pizzas using four types of dough and a number of vegetables, meats, and cheeses that employees help put together in front of the customer.  The pizzas are cooked in about three minutes in a self-ventilating conveyor oven.

The chain currently has stores in Arizona, New York, Kansas, Utah and California, with over 250 others in development throughout the United States.

Their first branch in Asia is located in the Uptown Parade of Bonifacio Global City in the Philippines. Exclusive Filipino Cuisine flavors were introduced like Sisig and Chicken Inasal.

References

2013 establishments in California
Pizza chains of the United States
Privately held companies based in California
Restaurants established in 2013
Restaurants in Los Angeles